The Khasa River is a winterbourne river which runs through the City of Kirkuk in northern Iraq. It dries up completely in the summer, but turns into a raging river in the winter which floods its banks at times, as happened in the 1950s. The river has a symbolic value to the city's inhabitants. It is one of the tributaries of the Tigris River.

Source 
 Kirkuk

References

Rivers of Iraq
Shatt al-Arab basin